Hydrophonic may refer to:

 Hydrophonic (New Monsoon album), 2001
 Hydrophonic (Soup Dragons album), 1992

See also
 Hydroponics, a subset of hydroculture